Marie Hsiao (born November 1, 1993), better known as Mree, is an American indie folk singer-songwriter. She is of Taiwanese and Bulgarian descent. Mree began writing her own songs at the age of 14 and released her debut studio album, Grow, in October 2011. The album debuted at No. 18 on the iTunes Singer-Songwriter Chart. She is currently married to Henri Bardot.

Music career
Hsiao began her career performing cover songs on YouTube. In 2011, she released her self-produced debut studio album, Grow The album debuted at No. 18 on the iTunes Singer-Songwriter Chart.

Mree released her second self-produced studio album, Winterwell, in August 2013. A day after its release, the album trended at No. 52 on iTunes' top alternative albums charts. In 2014, the album was awarded at Independent Music Awards in the "best producer" category, with jurors praising the "sophisticated soundscapes that cushion the songs."

As a performer, Mree has appeared at New York City venues including the Highline Ballroom, Rockwood Music Hall, and The Studio at Webster Hall.

In 2013, a Target commercial was released that featured a thirty-second clip of an original Christmas song by her entitled "Santa Catcher."

On December 8, 2015, she released her third studio album, Empty Nest.

Perlo
In February 2016, Mree announced Perlo, a collaboration with musician Henri Bardot. In March 2016, the duo released their debut extended play, Patterns.

Discography

Albums

 Grow (2011)
 Winterwell (2013)
 Empty Nest (2015)
 Silver and Gold – EP (2017)
 The Middle – EP (2019)
 Bloom – EP (2020)

Singles

 "Lift Me Up" (2011)
 "Of the Trees" (2011)
 "Monsters" (2012)
 "Into The Well" (2013)
 "Fame (Cover)" (2014)
 "Talkabout" (2015)
 "The Evergreen" (2016)
 "Passion (Sanctuary) (Cover)" (2016)
 "Lava Lamp (Cover)" (2017)
 "Harvest Moon" (2017)
 "In the Kitchen" (2018)
 "The Middle" (2018)
 "Face My Fears" (2019)
 "In Your Eyes / Open Arms" (2020)
 "May" (2020)
 "Ode to Undertale" (2021)
 "Some Days" (2022)

References

External links

 
 

1993 births
Living people
21st-century American singers
American women singer-songwriters
American folk singers
American indie pop musicians
American musicians of Taiwanese descent
American people of Bulgarian descent
American women musicians of Chinese descent
American YouTubers
Indie folk musicians
21st-century American women singers
Singer-songwriters from New Jersey